The Castro Valley Unified School District (CVUSD) is located in Castro Valley, California, United States. It is a public preschool through adult school district. Overall, the district contains almost 9,000 students. It was created in 1965.

The Castro Valley Unified School District consists of the following schools:

Elementary schools (K-5) 
 Castro Valley Elementary School
 Chabot Elementary School
 Independent Elementary School
 Jensen Ranch Elementary School
 Marshall Elementary School
 Palomares Elementary School
 Proctor Elementary School
 Stanton Elementary School
 Vannoy Elementary School

Middle schools (6-8)
 Canyon Middle School
 Creekside Middle School

High schools (9-12)
 Castro Valley High School - has over 2,900 students
 Redwood High School - an alternative high school with approximately 193 students in 2005

Adult school
 Castro Valley Adult School

References

External links
 

School districts in Alameda County, California
School districts established in 1965
1965 establishments in California